Charlotte Lewis (born 7 August 1967) is an English actress.

Early life
Lewis attended Bishop Douglass School in Finchley. Her mother is Irish-English, while her father—a doctor whom she never met—is half-Chilean and half-Iraqi.

Career
Lewis made her film debut as a teenager in the 1986 Roman Polanski film Pirates. She followed it that same year with the female lead in The Golden Child alongside Eddie Murphy. Later appearances include the film Tripwire (1990) and Storyville (1992), opposite James Spader. She had a co-starring role in Men of War (1994), alongside Dolph Lundgren, and in the 1995 film Decoy. Lewis appeared in the 2003 film Hey DJ.

Lewis also appeared in a cover-featured pictorial in the July 1993 issue of Playboy magazine.

Lewis acted in the 2019 film Lost Angelas playing Angie Malone, one of the title roles.

Accusation against Roman Polanski
On 14 May 2010, Lewis and her Los Angeles-based attorney Gloria Allred accused Roman Polanski of sexually assaulting the actress when she was 16 years old, while the two worked together on Pirates. Prosecutors in Los Angeles confirmed that they interviewed Lewis
in connection with the allegations. According to Lewis, the alleged incident occurred at Polanski's Paris apartment in 1983.

In 2010, an article called into question Lewis' testimony by referencing an account of events she gave in an interview with the UK's News of the World, in which she had spoken of a relationship with Polanski, along with several other actors. Later, in December 2019, French magazine L’Obs came back to the News of the World story, relating a "violent campaign to discredit her" in the media. Charlotte Lewis said: "I was completely alone in 2010. No one believed me. They said I was a prostitute, a liar. I'm a little anxious to talk. The media got me so depressed."

Filmography

Film

Television

References

External links

Living people
1967 births
20th-century English actresses
21st-century English actresses
Actresses from London
British actors of Latin American descent
English film actresses
English people of Chilean descent
English people of Iraqi descent
English people of Irish descent
English television actresses
People from Kensington